The national average salary (or national average wage) is the mean salary for the working population of a nation. It is calculated by summing all the annual salaries of all persons in work and dividing the total by the number of workers. It is not the same as the Gross domestic product (GDP) per capita, which is calculated by dividing the GDP by the total population of a country, including the unemployed and those not in the workforce (e.g. retired people, children, students, etc.).

See also
 List of countries by average wage
 List of countries in Europe by average wage

Wages and salaries